Margot Trooger (2 June 1923 – 24 April 1994) was a German film actress. She appeared in 50 films between 1952 and 1976. She was born in Rositz, Germany and died in Mörlenbach, Germany.

Selected filmography

 Ich mach dich glücklich (1949) - Waitress at store bar (uncredited)
 When the Heath Dreams at Night (1952) - Helga
 Shooting Stars (1952) - Herta Wernicke
 The Confession of Ina Kahr (1954) - Margit Kahr
 Secrets of the City (1955) - Paula
 Roses in Autumn (1955) - Johanna
  (1962, TV miniseries) - Marian Hastings
  (1962) - Katharina
 Eleven Years and One Day (1963) - Fanni Gruber
 Ein Frauenarzt klagt an (1964) - Lotte Hartmann
 Tre per una rapina (1964) - Margot Weimer
 Der Hexer (1964) - Cora Ann Milton
 Traitor's Gate (1964) - Dinah
 Neues vom Hexer (1965) - Cora Ann Milton
  (1965) - Margret Brinkmann
 Heidi (1965) - Fräulein Rottenmeier
 The Doctor Speaks Out (1966) - Frau Sidler
  (1967) - L'Américaine
 Das Rasthaus der grausamen Puppen (1967) - Marilyn Oland
 Jet Generation - Wie Mädchen heute Männer lieben (1968)
 I'm an Elephant, Madame (1969) - Mrs. Nemitz
 Pippi Longstocking (1969) - Mrs. Prysselius
  (1969) - Jertrude
 Van de Velde: Das Leben zu zweit - Sexualität in der Ehe (1969) - Elisabeth
  (1969, TV film) - Queen Isabella
 Pippi Goes on Board (1969) - Mrs. Prysselius
 Wir hau'n den Hauswirt in die Pfanne (1971) - Lenchen Kleinschmidt
 Bleib sauber, Liebling! (1971) - Frau Stubenrauch
 Auch ich war nur ein mittelmäßiger Schüler (1974) - Fräulein Landgraf

References

External links

1923 births
1994 deaths
German film actresses
German television actresses
People from Altenburger Land
20th-century German actresses